Uropods are posterior appendages found on a wide variety of crustaceans. They typically have functions in locomotion.

Definition
Uropods are often defined as the appendages of the last body segment of a crustacean. An alternative definition suggested by Frederick R. Schram restricts the term to those structures arising from the segment before the anal segment (the segment which carries the anus). Under this latter definition, the appendages of the anal segment are caudal rami, which are analogous to uropods.

Form
Uropods are typically biramous – comprising an endopod and an exopod. The exopod is typically the larger, and may be divided in two by a transverse suture known as the diaeresis. The uropods may work in concert with the telson to form a "tail fan".

References

Crustacean anatomy